Pétanque competitions at the 2021 Southeast Asian Games took place at Pétanque Boulodrome in Hanoi, Vietnam from 13 to 19 May 2021.

Medal table

Medalists

Men

Women

Mixed

References

Pétanque
2021